Butt Trumpet is a Los Angeles-based punk band founded and maintained by Thom Bone. It is known for its crass lyrics and deliberately offensive style. The group features two bassists among its members. They became famous in 1994 when their Chrysalis Records debut, Primitive Enema, was banned from sale in a Massachusetts town after one mother heard her 12-year-old daughter listening to it, which she called "audio porn." Dan Druff played in the group briefly in 1995. The "Enema" lineup splintered soon after Primitive Enema was released, but three of the members regrouped in 1998 as Betty Blowtorch. The founder of the project, Thom Bone, continues to release and tour with various deliberately unstable band lineups to this day.

Discography 
(1992): Butt Trumpet Jr. 5-song EP (Self-released, cassette only)
(1992): "DICKtatorship" 7-inch (Hell Yeah Records)
(1993): "The Grindcore Song" 7-inch (Signal Sound Records)
(1993): "I Left My Flannel In Seattle" b/w "Pink Gun" 7-inch (Hell Yeah Records)
(1994): Primitive Enema Album (Chrysalis Records)
(1994): "Primitive Enema" b/w "Yesterday II, The Sequel 7-inch (Chrysalis Records)
(1996): Quadruple Headache compilation (Last Resort Records)
(1996): Board Stiff Album (INTERNET ONLY release)
(1997): Show & Tell: A Stormy Remembrance of TV Theme Songs compilation (Gammon Records)
(2000): Wrestling Slams and Jams compilation (EMI Records)
(2005): Butt Trumpet/Dive Bar Junkies Split EP 10-inch (Felony Records)
(2006): Butt Trumpet/Potbelly split 7-inch (PB Records)
(2009): Censurado Trompeto Anal 8-song EP (Rumble Records) Spain
(2010): Punk Rock Repo compilation Germany
(2011): Cheap Ass Music Volume One compilation (Cheap Ass Records)
(2013): Butt Trumpet/Youth Gone Mad Split LP

References

External links 
[Thom Bone's Facebook page]
Myspace
Official homepage
Interview with a band member

Punk rock groups from California
Musical groups from Los Angeles
Musical groups established in 1991
1991 establishments in California